Adam Maria Niemiec (born 8 September 1947) is a Polish former basketball player. He competed in the men's tournament at the 1968 Summer Olympics.

References

External links
 
 
 

1947 births
Living people
Polish men's basketball players
Olympic basketball players of Poland
Basketball players at the 1968 Summer Olympics
People from Milanówek
Sportspeople from Masovian Voivodeship